Pecineaga is a commune in Constanța County, Northern Dobruja, Romania. To the southeast of the commune lies the city of Mangalia.

Administration
The commune includes two villages: 
Pecineaga (old names: Gherengic until 1923, ; I.G. Duca between 1933 and 1940)
Vânători (historical names: Haidarchioi).

Demographics
According to the 2002 census, the commune had a population 3,063, of which 97% were Romanians and the rest mostly Turks and Tatars. At the 2011 census, Pecineaga had 2,959 Romanians (95.82%), 77 Turks (2.49%), 36 Tatars (1.17%), 10 Roma (0.32%), and 6 others (0.19%).

History
It was named after the Pechenegs, a Turkic semi-nomadic people which settled in this place in the 10th/11th century. When founded, the village bore the name Gerencik. It was colonized successively by Crimean Tatars (1857), Transylvanian shepherds (Mocani) (after 1878), ploughers from Brăila County (1885) and Râmnicu Sărat. From 1933 until 1940 the village was named Ion Gheorghe Duca, after the prime minister assassinated in 1933 by an Iron Guard death squad.

Natives
 Mehmet Niyazi

References

Communes in Constanța County
Localities in Northern Dobruja
Place names of Turkish origin in Romania